Henry Emerson may refer to:
Henry E. Emerson (1925–2015), U.S. Army general
Henry I. Emerson (1871–1953), American politician

See also 
Henry Emmerson (1853–1914), New Brunswick lawyer, businessman, politician, and philanthropist
Henry Read Emmerson (1883–1954), Canadian senator
Henry Hetherington Emmerson (1831–1895), English painter and illustrator
Harry Emerson Fosdick (1878–1969), American clergyman
Harry Emerson Wildes (1890–1982), American sociologist